Caesar Hoskins Log Cabin is located in Mauricetown section of Commercial Township, Cumberland County, New Jersey, United States. The building is believed to have been built in 1690s by Swedes for Capt. Caesar Hoskins. It was added to the National Register of Historic Places on September 10, 1987.

See also
National Register of Historic Places listings in Cumberland County, New Jersey
List of the oldest buildings in New Jersey

References

External links
Caesar Hoskins Cabin

Commercial Township, New Jersey
Houses on the National Register of Historic Places in New Jersey
Houses completed in 1690
Houses in Cumberland County, New Jersey
Museums in Cumberland County, New Jersey
Historic house museums in New Jersey
Log cabins in the United States
National Register of Historic Places in Cumberland County, New Jersey
New Jersey Register of Historic Places
Log buildings and structures on the National Register of Historic Places in New Jersey
Swedish American culture in New Jersey
Swedish-American history
New Sweden
1690 establishments in New Jersey